Shregegon (also, Sca-goines, Schre-gon, Ser-a-goines, Seragoins, Serragoin, Sira-grins, and Sri-gon) is a former Yurok settlement in Humboldt County, California.

References

Former settlements in Humboldt County, California
Former populated places in California
Yurok villages